King of the Children is a 1987 drama film directed by Chen Kaige and starring Chen Shaohua.  The film was based on a novella of the same name by Ah Cheng. The film competed for the Palme D'Or at the 1988 Cannes Film Festival.

Plot
A young man is sent to teach at a rural school in a poverty stricken area of Yunnan province.

Cast
 Chen Shaohua
 Xie Yuan
 Yang Xuewen

Reception
King of the Children received a highly positive review in Time Out, where a reviewer wrote, “There are echoes here of a film like Padre Padrone, but Chen's film is completely free of flabby humanist sentimentality. [...] By Chinese standards, this is film-making brave to the point of being visionary. By any standards, this follow-up to Yellow Earth and The Big Parade is also something like a masterpiece.”

References

External links

 King of the Children from the Chinese Movie Database

1987 films
1987 drama films
Chinese drama films
Mandarin-language films
Films set in Yunnan
Films directed by Chen Kaige
Films based on Chinese novels